Powell–Brookshire–Parker Farm, also known as Summer Duck Farm, is a historic farm complex and national historic district located near Ellerbe, Richmond County, North Carolina.  The main house, known as The Brookshire House, was built about 1870, and is a 1 1/2-story, rectangular, frame dwelling with a side gable roof.  It has Greek Revival and Late Victorian style design elements.   Also on the property are the contributing two dependencies (1940s), flowerhouse (c. 1940), corncrib and guano house (19th century), barn, watering trough, hog butchering scaffold (c. 1940), stock and hay barn (1937), gate, and the Powell–Brookshire Cemetery.

It was listed on the National Register of Historic Places in 2008.

References

Farms on the National Register of Historic Places in North Carolina
Historic districts on the National Register of Historic Places in North Carolina
Greek Revival houses in North Carolina
Victorian architecture in North Carolina
Houses completed in 1870
Buildings and structures in Randolph County, North Carolina
National Register of Historic Places in Richmond County, North Carolina